Roßdorf am Forst is a small village located in Bavaria, Germany. It is in Upper Franconia, in the Bamberg district. Roßdorf am Forst is a constituent community of Strullendorf.

In 2009, Roßdorf am Forst had a total population of 510.

Geography
The village is about 3 kilometers north-east from Strullendorf. It has an area of about 28 hectares.

It has an elevation of about 300 meters.

History

Roßdorf am Forst was mentioned for the first time in the second half of the 12th century; it was at that time called "Ratestorf."

Infrastructure
In Roßdorf am Forst there is a brewery and restaurant named the "Brauerei Sauer."

Around the town are the Staatsstraßen 2276, 2210 and 2188. In the west lies the Bundesautobahn 73.

References

External links
History of Roßdorf am Forst (on the Strullendorf site) 
Brauerei Sauer 

Villages in Bavaria
Bamberg (district)
Strullendorf